Immaculate is an upcoming American horror film, directed by Michael Mohan, from a screenplay by Andrew Lobel. It stars Sydney Sweeney, Álvaro Morte, Benedetta Porcaroli, Dora Romano, Giorgio Colangeli and Simona Tabasco.

Cast
 Sydney Sweeney
 Álvaro Morte
 Benedetta Porcaroli
 Dora Romano
 Giorgio Colangeli
 Simona Tabasco

Production
In October 2022, it was announced Sydney Sweeney had joined the cast of the film, with Michael Mohan directing from a screenplay by Andrew Lobel, with Sweeney serving as a producer under her Fifty-Fifty Films banner. In February 2023, Álvaro Morte, Benedetta Porcaroli, Dora Romano, Giorgio Colangeli and Simona Tabasco joined the cast of the film.

Principal photography concluded by February 2023.

References

External links
 

Upcoming films
American horror films
Black Bear Pictures films